The American Society of Cinematographers Award for Outstanding Achievement in Cinematography in an Episode of a One-Hour Television Series – Non-Commercial is an annual award given by the American Society of Cinematographers to cinematographers working in non-commercial television. It was first awarded in 2016, when the awards separated it Regular Series award, splitting ad-sponsored television programs and non-sponsored, cable or streaming series into two categories. In 2020, the distinction of "One-Hour" was added, as half-hour programs were given their own categories.

Winners and nominees

1980s

1990s

2000s

2010s

2020s

Programs with multiple wins
Totals from combined category included.

3 wins
 Boardwalk Empire (HBO)
 The Crown (Netflix)
 CSI: Crime Scene Investigation (CBS)
 Game of Thrones (HBO)

2 wins
 Murder One (ABC)
 Murder, She Wrote (NBC)
 Smallville (The CW)
 The West Wing (NBC)
 The X-Files (Fox)
|}

Programs with multiple nominations
Totals from combined category included.

10 nominations
 Game of Thrones (HBO)

9 nominations
 CSI: Crime Scene Investigation (CBS)
 The X-Files (Fox)

7 nominations
 Boardwalk Empire (HBO)
 Smallville (The WB/CW)

5 nominations
 NYPD Blue (ABC)
 The West Wing (NBC)

4 nominations
 Ally McBeal (Fox)
 The Crown (Netflix)
 The Handmaid's Tale (Hulu)

3 nominations
 Beauty and the Beast (CBS)
 Chicago Hope (CBS)
 Gotham (Fox)
 Jake and the Fatman (CBS)
 Millennium (Fox)
 Quantum Leap (NBC)
 Titans (DC Universe/HBO Max)

2 nominations
 Alias (ABC)
 Carnivàle (HBO)
 CSI: Miami (CBS)
 Dark Blue (TNT)
 Dr. Quinn, Medicine Woman (CBS)
 House (Fox)
 Moonlighting (ABC)
 Mad Men (AMC)
 The Man in the High Castle (Amazon)
 The Marvelous Mrs. Maisel (Amazon)
 Murder One (ABC)
 Murder, She Wrote (NBC)
 Outlander (Starz)
 Paradise (CBS)
 The Young Riders (ABC)

References

American Society of Cinematographers Awards
Awards for best cinematography